Yongsin-dong is a dong, neighbourhood of Dongdaemun-gu in Seoul, South Korea. It consists of the two legal dong Sinseol-dong and Yongdu-dong.

See also
Administrative divisions of South Korea

References

External links
Dongdaemun-gu map

Neighbourhoods of Dongdaemun District